The Copernicus Legacy is a bestselling series written by Tony Abbott. It is about the adventures of Wade Kaplan, Darrell Kaplan, Lily, Becca Moore, Roald Kaplan, and Sara Kaplan to try to destroy a time machine made by Ptolemy, but discovered and used by Nicolaus Copernicus, from the dangerous Teutonic Order of Ancient Prussia.  It currently has four books in the series, but one is in a series diverted from The Copernicus Legacy called Copernicus Archives. While a work of fiction, it does incorporate some facts about Copernicus's history.

Books
The Forbidden Stone (2014)
Copernicus Archives: Wade and the Scorpion's Claw (2014)
The Serpent's Curse (2014)
Copernicus Archives: Becca and the Prisoner's Cross (2015)
The Golden Vendetta (2015)
The Crown of Fire (2016)

Children's fantasy novels
Fantasy novel series
Series of children's books
2010s children's books
2010s fantasy novels